Fat Tony & Co. is a nine-episode Australian television series focusing on Tony Mokbel and covers the manhunt which lasted 18 months and dismantled a drug empire. It premiered on 23 February 2014 and concluded on 6 April 2014 on the Nine Network. It is technically a part of the Underbelly franchise, with various actors reprising their role from previous series.

Production

Conception 
Fat Tony & Co. has been marketed as a sequel to the first series of Underbelly, however due to changes in funding with Screen Australia it was not branded as an Underbelly series. Fat Tony and Co actually runs chronologically alongside of Underbelly, with the storyline being told from the point of view of Mokbel. The first few episodes chronicle his rise while the "Melbourne gangland war" is taking place but the later episodes focus on his disappearance and arrest in Greece, and other events that unfolded after the original series of Underbelly concluded.

After a rumour in November 2012, Fat Tony & Co. was officially announced on 3 August 2013. Production for the series began on 5 August 2013.

Fat Tony & Co. was directed by Peter Andrikidis, Andrew Prowse and Karl Zwicky, with Jo Rooney, Andy Ryan, Peter Gawler and Elisa Argenzio Lambert serving as producers.

While most of Fat Tony & Co. was shot in Melbourne, some sequences were filmed in Athens, Greece.

Casting 
Most of the cast from the first series of Underbelly return to play the same characters, although some were unavailable to reprise their signature roles such as Kat Stewart who played Roberta Williams, replaced by Hollie Andrew; Caroline Gillmer who played Judy Moran, replaced by Debra Byrne and Callan Mulvey who played Mark Moran, replaced by Jake Ryan.

Cast

Regular 
 Robert Mammone as Tony Mokbel
 Madeleine West as Danielle McGuire
 Gyton Grantley as Carl Williams
 Hollie Andrew as Roberta Williams
 Shane Jacobson as Det. Insp. Jim 'Big Kahuna' O'Brien
 Stephen Curry as Det. Sgt. Jim Coghlan
 Richard Cawthorne as Australian Federal Police agent Jarrod Ragg

Recurring and guest 

 Vince Colosimo as Alphonse Gangitano
 Les Hill as Jason Moran
 Simon Westaway as Mick Gatto
 Kevin Harrington as Lewis Moran
 Gerard Kennedy as Graham Kinniburgh
 Debra Byrne as Judy Moran
 Rich Davine as Pasquale Barbaro
 Louise Mandylor as Laura Mokbel
 Jake Ryan as Mark Moran
 Jeremy Kewley as Des 'Tuppence' Moran
 Frank Sweet as Billy Fischer
 Brian Vriends as Det. Sgt. Malcolm Rosenes
 David Brown as Det. Sam Martone
 Nick Simpson-Deeks as Bruno
 Simone Kessell as Tamara Chippindall
 Steve Bastoni as Homicide Det. Charlie Bezzina
 Nicholas Bishop as Det. Sgt. Paul Dale
 Louisa Mignone as Maria Tomasetti

 Mat Stevenson as Prosecutor
 Tom Wren as Willie Thompson
 Alex Tsitsopoulos as Milad Mokbel
 Vince Poletto as Horty Mokbel
 Samantha Tolj as Renee Mokbel
 Odette Joannidis as Carmel Mokbel
 Maria Mercedes as Agape Makrakanis
 Steve Mouzakis as Major George Kastanis
 Jason Gianginis as Incorruptible Police Detective
 Tony Nikolakopoulos as Stavros Makrakanis
 Robert Rabiah as Dario Mancini
 Costas Kilias as Head of Hellenic Anti Drug Dept
 James Chalas as Yiannis Vlahos Lawyer
 Zoe Cramond as Lawyer Zara Garde-Wilson
 Alan King as Sean Grant
 Dean Cartmel as Phil Costa
 Lester Ellis Jr. as Johnny Tedesco

Episodes

Series ratings

See also 
 List of Australian television series
 Underbelly: A Tale of Two Cities

References

External links 
 

2010s Australian crime television series
2010s Australian drama television series
2010s Australian television miniseries
2014 Australian television series debuts
2014 Australian television series endings
APRA Award winners
English-language television shows
Works about organised crime in Australia
Melbourne gangland killings
Nine Network original programming
Television series set in the 1990s
Television series set in the 2000s
Television shows set in Victoria (Australia)
Television series about organized crime
Television series by Screentime